The 1984 Gran Premio dell'Adriatico (Grand Prix of the Adriatic Sea) took place on July 22, and was the eighth round of the 1984 European Championship for F2 Drivers. It was held at the Circuito Internazionale Santamonica, near the town of Misano Adriatico (Province of Rimini) in the frazione of Santamonica, Italy.

Report

Entry
The F2 brigade returned to Italy, however, the race only contained eighteen cars. Prior to qualification, the PMC Motorsport / BS Automotive team did not arrive with a car for Pascal Fabre.

Qualifying
Roberto Moreno took the pole position for Ralt Racing Ltd, in their Ralt-Honda RH6, with an average speed of 113.507 mph.

Race
The race was held over 58 laps of the Misano Circuit. Mike Thackwell won the race for Ralt, driving their Ralt-Honda RH6. The Kiwi won with a time of 1hr 08:15.71ins., and had an average speed of 110.872 mph. Second place went to Frenchman Philippe Streiff aboard the AGS-BMW JH19C, entered by AGS Elf (Armagnac Bigorre). Streiff was one lap adrift. The podium was completed by Pierre Petit in the Onyx Race Engineering's March-BMW 842.

Classification

Race Result

 Fastest lap: Roberto Moreno, 1:08.50secs. (113.871 mph)

References

 

Adriatico
Adriatico
Gran Premio dell’Adriatico